Cole McConchie (born 12 January 1992) is a New Zealand cricketer who plays for Canterbury as an all-rounder. He made his international debut for the New Zealand cricket team in September 2021.

Career

Canterbury
McConchie made his debut for Canterbury in a List A match against Otago on 25 November 2011. He played one more List A game for Canterbury that season, before being offered a contract for the 2012-13 season. He made both his First Class and Twenty20 debuts that season.

In November 2016 McConchie, playing only his seventh First Class game, hit his maiden century in a rain-affected draw against Otago.

In 2018, McConchie was named as Canterbury captain.

In June 2018, he was awarded a contract with Canterbury for the 2018–19 season. He was the leading wicket-taker for Canterbury in the 2018–19 Ford Trophy, with thirteen dismissals in nine matches.

In June 2020, he was offered a contract by Canterbury ahead of the 2020–21 domestic cricket season.

New Zealand A
In November 2020, McConchie was named as the captain of the New Zealand A cricket team for practice matches against the touring West Indies team.

New Zealand
In August 2021, McConchie was named in New Zealand's Twenty20 International (T20I) squad for their tour of Bangladesh, and in New Zealand's One Day International (ODI) squad for their tour of Pakistan. McConchie made his T20I debut on 1 September 2021, for New Zealand against Bangladesh, taking a wicket with his first ball in a T20I match. He played in all five matches in the series, scoring 32 runs and taking seven wickets.

References

External links
 

1992 births
Living people
New Zealand cricketers
New Zealand Twenty20 International cricketers
Canterbury cricketers
Cricketers from Christchurch